Noelia Barbeito (Mendoza, Argentina, October 25, 1981) is a provincial senator in Mendoza Province, Argentina.

She is a member of the Socialist Workers' Party, and was elected as a candidate of the Workers' Left Front in October 2013. She is the Front's candidate for governor of Mendoza Province in February 2015. She is a history teacher.

References 

Socialist Workers' Party (Argentina) politicians
Argentine schoolteachers
Argentine women educators
People from Mendoza, Argentina
Argentine Trotskyists
1981 births
Living people
21st-century Argentine educators